The 2001 Men's European Water Polo Championship was the 25th edition of the bi-annual event, organised by the Europe's governing body in aquatics, the Ligue Européenne de Natation. The event took place in Budapest, Hungary from June 15 to June 24, 2001.

Teams

GROUP A

GROUP B

Preliminary round

GROUP A

Friday June 15, 2001

Saturday June 16, 2001

Sunday June 17, 2001

Monday June 18, 2001

Tuesday June 19, 2001

GROUP B

Friday June 15, 2001

Saturday June 16, 2001

Sunday June 17, 2001

Monday June 18, 2001

Tuesday June 19, 2001

Quarterfinals
Thursday June 21, 2001

Semifinals
Friday June 22, 2001

Finals
Saturday June 23, 2001 — Seventh place

Saturday June 23, 2001 — Fifth place

Sunday June 24, 2001 —  Bronze Medal

Sunday June 24, 2001 —  Gold Medal

Final ranking

Individual awards
Most Valuable Player

Best Goalkeeper

Best Scorer
 — 21 goals

References
  Results
  Kataca

Men
2001
International water polo competitions hosted by Hungary
European Championship
Water polo
International sports competitions in Budapest
2000s in Budapest
June 2001 sports events in Europe